The Association of Pacific Rim Universities (APRU) is a consortium of 61 research universities in 19 economies of the Pacific Rim. Formed in 1997, APRU fosters collaboration between member universities, researchers, and policymakers contributing to economic, scientific and cultural advancement in the Pacific Rim. Its headquarters, the APRU International University Centre, is located at the Cyberport in Hong Kong.

Members

Consists of Diliman, Baguio, Cebu, Los Baños, Manila, Mindanao, Open University, and Visayas campuses.

Steering Committee 
The Steering Committee is made up of 13 members, each of whom are chancellors, vice-chancellors or presidents of APRU universities, or staff from the APRU International Secretariat:

 Gene D. Block — Chancellor, UCLA; chair, APRU 
 Rocky S. Tuan — Vice-Chancellor and President, The Chinese University of Hong Kong; Vice Chair, APRU
 Bundhit Eua-arporn — President, Chulalongkorn University
 Jin Taek Chung — President, Korea University
 Subra Suresh — President, Nanyang Technological University, Singapore
 Zhongqin Lin — President, Shanghai Jiao Tong University
 David Garza — President, Tecnológico de Monterrey
 Dawn Freshwater — Vice-Chancellor, The University of Auckland
 Santa J. Ono — President and Vice Chancellor, The University of British Columbia
 Xiang Zhang — President and Vice-Chancellor, The University of Hong Kong
 Deborah Terry AO — Vice-Chancellor and President, The University of Queensland
 Carol Christ — Chancellor, UC Berkeley
 Aiji Tanaka — President, Waseda University
 Christopher Tremewan — Secretary General, APRU
 Sherman Cheng — Chief Financial Officer, APRU

International Secretariat 
Headed by the Secretary General, the APRU International Secretariat coordinates the agenda and programs of APRU. The Secretariat also plays an instrumental role in driving APRU's communications and global outreach. The Secretariat is currently based in Hong Kong and located at the Cyberport.

 Christopher Tremewan, Secretary General
 Angelique Chan, chair and Program Director, Population Aging Program
 Anya Wong, Program Officer
 Christina Maria Schönleber, Senior Director, Policy and Research Programs
 Elaine W. Hung, Events and Relations Manager
 Ellen Yau, Senior Administrative and Finance Officer
 Eric Chu, Executive Assistant to the Secretary General
 Jack Ng, Director, Communications
 Jackie Agnello Wong, Director, Network and Student Programs
 Mellissa Withers, Program Director, Global Health Program
 Sherman S. Cheng, Chief Financial Officer
 Takako Izumi, Program Director, Multi-Hazards Program
 Tina T. Y. Lin, Senior Program Officer
 Yekang Ko, Program Director, Sustainable Cities & Landscapes Program
 Yong Sik Ok, chair and Program Director, Sustainable Waste Management Program
 Chelsey Hawes, Program Coordinator, APWiL Mentoring Program

See also
List of higher education associations and alliances

References

External links
Association of Pacific Rim Universities

International college and university associations and consortia